The Chinese bahaba (Bahaba taipingensis), also known as the giant yellow croaker, is a critically endangered species of marine and brackish water fish in the family Sciaenidae. It is found on the coast of China, from the Yangtze River estuary southwards to the Pearl River estuary, including the waters of Hong Kong and Macau. Its natural habitats are shallow seas, subtidal aquatic beds, rocky shores, and estuarine waters.

Distribution
The Chinese bahaba is known only from the parts of China from the Yangtze River southwards to Hong Kong. It enters estuaries to spawn and in the past it was seasonally numerous in this habitat. This includes the estuaries of the Yangtze River, the Min River and the Pearl River and around the coast of Zhoushan Island.

Behaviour
The Chinese bahaba is a  bentopelagic fish that feeds mostly on crustaceans such as shrimps and crabs.

Conservation status
Annual catches of 50 tonnes were taken in the 1930s, but this had dwindled to 10 tonnes per year by the 1950s and 1960s when few large fish were caught.

The Chinese bahaba is threatened by overfishing and it is listed as critically endangered by the International Union for Conservation of Nature. Degradation of its estuarine spawning habitats may also have contributed to its decline. Although listed as a Grade II State Protected Species in China, which is supposed to restrict its capture, the sale of recently caught individuals to very high prices still occurs, and is even announced to the media. A part of the Pearl River estuary has been protected since 2005 by the Chinese Government in an attempt saving the species. Unlike the Chinese mainland, there is no legal protection of this species in Hong Kong, despite it being rare there, and that the World Wildlife Fund and fisheries scientists at the University of Hong Kong have recommended its protection to the local government. Chinese bahaba caught in Hong Kong are also sometimes transferred to the Chinese mainland where resold. The fishing is prompted by the value placed on the swim bladders of this fish for use in traditional Chinese medicine. In some markets, notably the Chinese markets, a good specimen swim bladder fetches more than its weight in gold. As the population of the Chinese bahaba declined, some trade shifted towards the closely related totoaba (Totoaba macdonaldi) of Mexico, a species that now also is seriously threatened.

See also
 List of endangered and protected species of China

References

Bahaba
Endemic fauna of China
Fish of China
Fauna of Hong Kong
Critically endangered fish
Critically endangered fauna of Asia
Fish described in 1932
Taxa named by Albert William Herre
Taxonomy articles created by Polbot
Critically endangered fauna of China